The 1999–2000 UEFA Champions League was the 45th season of the UEFA Champions League, UEFA's premier European club football tournament, and the eighth season since its rebranding from the "European Champion Clubs' Cup" or "European Cup". The competition was won by Real Madrid, who clinched a historic eighth title win by beating fellow La Liga side, Valencia in the final. The final was hosted in the Stade de France in Paris, the city where the original roots of the competition had begun nearly 50 years earlier.

Just after two years of allowing runners-up of strongest continental leagues to enter the tournament, UEFA went even further and expanded the tournament to up to four strongest teams from Europe's top national leagues. As a result, the tournament was a stark contrast from 1996–97 (which took place only three years prior) where only top national champions and title holders participated.

The competition was dominated by the Spanish teams, with three of the four semi-finalists coming from Spain, namely Real Madrid, Valencia and Barcelona. The final between Real Madrid and Valencia marked the first time that both finalists in the competition had come from the same country.

Manchester United were the defending champions, but were eliminated by eventual winners Real Madrid in the quarter-finals.

Changes to the competition format
The 1999–2000 edition of the Champions League featured a whole different format to the competition. An additional qualifying round was introduced to generate two group stages, firstly with 32 teams – eight groups of four – who played six matches each to reduce the competition to 16 teams for the second group stage, with the eight third-placed teams moving to the UEFA Cup third round. At the end of the second group stage, eight teams remained to contest the knock-out stage.

Association team allocation
A total of 71 teams participated in the 1999–2000 Champions League, from 47 of 51 UEFA associations. Liechtenstein (who don't have their own league) as well as Andorra and San Marino did not participate. Additionally, Bosnia and Herzegovina were not admitted due to having no nation-wide champion.

Below is the qualification scheme for the 2000–01 UEFA Champions League:
Associations 1–3 each have four teams qualify
Associations 4–6 each have three teams qualify
Associations 7–15 each have two teams qualify
Associations 16–48 each have one team qualify (except Liechtenstein)

Association ranking
Countries are allocated places according to their 1998 UEFA league coefficient, which takes into account their performance in European competitions from 1993–94 to 1997–98.

Distribution
The title holders (Manchester United) qualified for the Champions League group stage through their domestic league, thus the group stage spot reserved for the title holders was vacated. Additionally, Bosnia and Herzegovina was not admitted as their play-off for Champions League qualification didn't take place. Due to these factors, the following changes to the default access list are made:
The champions of association 10 (Norway) are promoted from the third qualifying round to the group stage.
The champions of association 16 (Switzerland) are promoted from the second qualifying round to the third qualifying round.
The champions of associations 27, 28 and 29 (Israel, Slovenia and Belarus) are promoted from the first qualifying round to the second qualifying round.

Participants
League positions of the previous season shown in parentheses (TH: Champions League title holders).

Notes

Round and draw dates
The schedule of the competition is as follows (all draws are held in Geneva, Switzerland, unless stated otherwise).

Qualifying rounds

First qualifying round

|}

Second qualifying round

|}

Third qualifying round
Losing teams advanced to the first round of the 1999–2000 UEFA Cup.

|}

First group stage

16 winners from the third qualifying round, 10 champions from countries ranked 1–10, and six second-placed teams from countries ranked 1–6 were drawn into eight groups of four teams each. Compared to the two previous seasons, three associations (England, France, The Netherlands) were allowed three teams – the league winner and runner-up from each nation qualified for the first group stage, and the third-placed teams qualified for the third qualifying round – and three associations were allowed four teams (Germany, Italy, Spain) – the league winner and runner-up from each nation qualified for the first group stage, and the third- and fourth-placed teams qualified for the third qualifying round. Eight additional associations were still allowed two teams (Czech Republic, Greece, Norway, Portugal: league winner in group stage; Austria, Croatia, Denmark, Turkey, Russia: league winner in third qualifying round). The top two teams in each group advanced to the Champions League second group stage, while the third-placed teams advanced to round three of the UEFA Cup.

AIK, Boavista, Bordeaux, Chelsea, Fiorentina, Hertha BSC, Lazio, Maribor, Molde, Valencia and Willem II made their debut in the group stage. Maribor was the first Slovenian side to play in group stage. Germany became the first association to have four teams in the Champions League group stage.

Tiebreakers, if necessary, are applied in the following order:
Points earned in head-to-head matches between the tied teams.
Total goals scored in head-to-head matches between the tied teams.
Away goals scored in head-to-head matches between the tied teams.
Cumulative goal difference in all group matches.
Total goals scored in all group matches.
Higher UEFA coefficient going into the competition.

Group A

Group B

Group C

Group D

Group E

Group F

Group G

Group H

Second group stage

Eight winners and eight runners-up from the first group stage were drawn into four groups of four teams each, each containing two group winners and two runners-up. Teams from the same country or from the same first-round group could not be drawn together. The top two teams in each group advanced to the quarter-finals.

Group A

Group B

Group C

Group D

Knockout stage

Bracket

Quarter-finals

|}

Semi-finals

|}

Final

Top goalscorers
The top scorers from the 1999–2000 UEFA Champions League (excluding qualifying rounds) are as follows:

See also
1999–2000 UEFA Cup
2000 UEFA Super Cup
1999 UEFA Intertoto Cup

References

External links
 1999–2000 All matches – season at UEFA website
1999–2000 Season On UEFA Website
European Club Football results at RSSSF.com
 All scorers 1999–2000 UEFA Champions League (excluding qualifying round) according to protocols UEFA + all scorers qualifying round
 1999/2000 UEFA Champions League - results and line-ups (archive)

 
1999–2000 in European football
UEFA Champions League seasons